The Cairo Conference against U.S. hegemony and war on Iraq and in solidarity with Palestine (later: Popular Campaign for the Support of Resistance in Palestine and Iraq and Against Globalization), generally known simply as Cairo Anti-war Conference, is an anti-war and anti-neo-liberalism conference held regularly since 2002 in Cairo, Egypt. The Cairo Conference set up the International Campaign Against Aggression on Iraq which helped to coordinate the worldwide demonstrations on 15 February 2003. In 2009, the Conference was banned by the government of former Egyptian President Hosni Mubarak.

First Conference – 2002
The first conference was held on 17–19 December 2002, at the Conrad Hotel on the banks of the Nile. Four hundred attended. Speakers included former United Nations (UN) humanitarian coordinator for Iraq Dr Hans von Sponeck. Former Algerian president Ahmed Ben Bella chaired the conference. One outcome of the conference was the production of the 'Cairo Declaration', which took a stance against the then-looming Iraq War; it also noted the negative effects of capitalist globalisation and U.S. hegemony on the peoples of the world (including European and American citizens). In addition, it noted that "In the absence of democracy, and with widespread corruption and oppression constituting significant obstacles along the path of the Arab peoples' movement towards economic, social, and intellectual progress, adverse consequences are further aggravated within the framework of the existing world order of neoliberal globalisation", while firmly rejecting the 'advance of democracy' justification for attacking Iraq.

The British Stop the War Coalition, in particular John Rees of the SWP, initiated the signing of the declaration by European leftists, including politicians Jeremy Corbyn, George Galloway and Tony Benn, Susan George (scholar/activist based in France), Bob Crow, Mick Rix (general secretary, UK train drivers' Aslef union), Julie Christie, George Monbiot, Harold Pinter, Ghayasuddin Siddiqui (Muslim Parliament), Tommy Sheridan (Scottish socialist), Dr Ghada Karmi (research fellow, Institute of Arab and Islamic Studies, University of Exeter), Tariq Ali.

The conference was followed by a 1,000-strong anti-war demonstration that was surrounded by riot police and armoured cars.

The organising committee decided to attempt solidarity actions with the US demonstrations on 18 January and to organise Egyptian demonstrations as part of 15 February global anti-war day.

Second Conference – 2003
Held 13 and 14 December 2003, at the Egyptian Journalists' Union headquarters. This had 800 attendees. George Galloway, Tony Benn, Salma Yaqoob, and former US attorney-general Ramsey Clark were among the international speakers. Prominent Egyptian campaigners taking part included Nasserist MP Hamdeen Sabahy, Galal Aref, head of the Egyptian Journalists' Union, and Ma'mun al-Hodeiby, leader of the outlawed Muslim Brotherhood. Egyptian novelist Sonallah Ibrahim and human rights activist Aida Seif-al-Dawla were among the conference organisers.

The presence of Muslim Brotherhood leader Ma'mun al-Hodeiby brought a large number of Islamist activists into the conference. The Muslim Brotherhood, although officially banned, is by far Egypt's largest opposition organisation. However, some delegates were critical of the Muslim Brotherhood's cooperation with the government in a series of stage-managed anti-war rallies held before the invasion of Iraq.

German journalist Harold Schuman who attended the conference expressed frustration that most speeches did not analyse the role of Arab governments but rather took the easy way out by placing all the blame on the US. He also expressed his feelings that the conference should defend the people of Iraq but not the regime. Representatives of the Iraqi government were attending the conference, though also the Iraqi opposition had a presence in the form of Abdel-Amir Al-Rikabi who described himself as a member of "the honest opposition" in contrast with those who met at a US-sponsored event in London.

Third Conference – 2005
24–27 March 2005. Political groups, independent activists, and organisations in Egypt were invited to take part in the conference and also to propose their own activities to take place at the same time as the conference.

Before the conference Yehia Fikri, who represents the Center for Socialist Studies on the organising committee, called for International delegations to come to the conference in order to protect it from state repression. He has said "The more people who come from abroad, the more prominent personalities who sign up for the conference, the more difficult it will be for the Egyptian authorities to shut us down."

Egyptian organisations supported the third conference
I. Political Groups and parties
20th of March Movement for Change, Egyptian Communist Party, Dignity Party, Muslim Brotherhood, Organization of Revolutionary Socialists, Socialist People's Party, Wasat Party.

II. Unions and Syndicates
Arab Medical Union, Syndicate of Pharmacists of Egypt

III. Popular committees
Committee for coordination between professional syndicates, Committee of boycott in professional syndicates, Committee of boycott of Zionist Project, Coordination committee for trade union and workers liberties and rights, General Egyptian committee of boycott, Popular committee in solidarity with the Palestinian Intifada-Alexandria.

IV. Research centers and civil society organizations
A’afak Ishterakeyya Center (Center of Socialist Horizons); Egyptian Center for media, culture and development; Hisham Mubarak Law Center; Sa’ed Center; Socialist Studies Center

Fourth Conference – 2006
The fourth conference, under the rubric "International Campaign against US and Zionist Occupation", was held 23–26 March 2006, on a platform expressed through the slogans "With the Resistance in Palestine and Iraq" and "Against Globalization, Imperialism and Zionism".

The conference discussed means of supporting the resistance in Palestine and Iraq, challenged U.S. and Israeli plans to expand their aggression against the region to Syria and/or Iran as well as their plans to liquidate Palestinian and Lebanese resistance organisations, dealt with the issue of supporting the struggle of the peoples of the Arab world for democracy against regimes of the region who collude with aggressors, and called for expanding and developing social struggles against globalisation policies in the Arab region.

The Final Declaration of the conference addressed all of these issues. The declaration expressed support for the Hamas government of the Palestinian National Authority against the U.S., Europe and Arab regimes, and opposition to "a peace process that has achieved nothing for the Palestinian people during the last two decades", while rejecting both recognition of Israel and any concessions to it on "the main national demands".

The declaration also stated the ambition to break what it termed "the siege" on the resistance in Iraq, called on neighbouring countries to support "the legitimate Iraqi resistance", and took the position that the Iraqi resistance is "the sole representative of the Iraqi People". In regard to escalating American pressure on Iran and Syria, the conference agreed on an international day of solidarity with Iran and Syria on 6 May 2006, an ambition that was reiterated regarding Iran in a separate call for "international coordinated action" that was attached to the declaration.

The declaration also called for "a new Arab movement for change", including "all possible forms of coordination between different democracy movements" and the formation of support committees to protect judges, journalists, lecturers and students against repression.

Fifth Conference – 2007
The fifth Cairo Conference was held between March 29 and April 1, 2007. Its declaration is here . According to the Al-Ahram, the conference was organised by  Alkarama (Dignity), Al-Ishtirakyin Al-Sawryin (Socialist Revolutionary Party), Al-Ikhwan Al-Muslimin (Muslim Brotherhood) and Al-'Amal (Labour), and was held at the Egyptian Press Syndicate, with close to 600 participants and observers from around the world, including a delegation of 80 South Koreans and 20 Canadians. The Muslim Brotherhood reported there were activists present from Palestine (including Hamas members), Iraq, Lebanon, Venezuela, Turkey, Greece, Nigeria, Britain, Tunisia, Sudan, France and Iran. Speakers included Ali Fayed of Hizbullah, Sadala Mazraani of the Lebanese Communist Party, James Clark of the Canadian Peace Alliance, Feroze Mithiborwala of the Muslim Intellectual Forum of India, John Rees of the Socialist Workers Party (UK) and Rose Gentle (the mother of Gordon Gentle, a British soldier killed while serving in Iraq, and a leading figure in Military Families Against the War).

Sixth Conference – 2008
The sixth Cairo antiwar conference was held March 27–30, 2008.

Seventh Conference – 2009
"The seventh Cairo anti-war conference was cancelled after being denied access to a venue".

The Egyptian government and the Cairo conference
Although the Egyptian government was formally against the Iraq War, relations between it and the conference are strained by the fact that Hosni Mubarak's regime received funding from the United States and that the regime feared popular movements which may have grown to challenge its dictatorship.

Criticism
Among the criticisms of the first Conference was that it was building solidarity not with ordinary Iraqis, but rather with the Iraqi government of Saddam Hussein. This perception was fueled by the reported presence of a number of Iraqi officials at the conference. According to Al-Ahram Weekly, German journalist and author Harald Schuman attracted the ire of Nabil Negm, the chief political adviser to the Iraqi president, after comments he made insisting that claims that all the problems of the Arab world could be laid at the door of the US were only half-true and that the conference was not meant to "defend the Iraqi regime and Saddam Hussein in any shape or form". "I am here," he said, "to defend the Iraqi people."

Further information
 Article on state repression of Egyptian anti-war movement 
 Article on the relationship between anti-war movement and movement for democracy in the Middle East

References

First Conference
 Article on 1st conference, Socialist Worker
 Report on first conference by Al-Ahram
 Stan Crooke, "The Politics of the Cairo Declaration," New Politics, Vol. IX, No. 3 (New Series), Summer 2003, pp. 120–126.

Second Conference
 Article on the 2nd conference, Socialist Worker
 Report on second conference by Al-Ahram

Third Conference
 Article on the call for a 3rd conference, Socialist Worker
 Video of Report of Conference at Manchester Peace Rally
 Swindon delegates report back from Cairo anti-war conference (indymedia)

Fourth Conference
 Final Declaration of the Cairo Conference 2006
 Invitation to the Conference (includes links to the Conference Briefing and Program)

Anti–Iraq War groups
Middle East peace efforts
Political movements
Anti-war
21st century in Cairo